Jessica Elise De Gouw (born 15 February 1988) is an Australian actress. She is known for her role as Helena Bertinelli/The Huntress in the television series Arrow, as Mina Murray in the NBC TV series Dracula, and as Elizabeth Hawkes in the WGN series Underground.

Early life
De Gouw grew up in Lesmurdie, an eastern suburb of Perth, Western Australia, where she attended Lesmurdie Senior High School. She appeared in an episode of The Sleepover Club, as well as a short film. In 2010, she graduated from Curtin University with a degree in performance studies. She also appeared in another short film the same year.

Career

After graduation, De Gouw moved to Sydney for her acting career. While there, she appeared in a number of TV series, mainly in guest starring roles.

In 2012, she debuted in the film Kath & Kimderella as Isabella, Kath and Kim's maid. She moved to Los Angeles later that year and landed the recurring role of Helena Bertinelli/The Huntress in the action-adventure series, Arrow.

In 2013, De Gouw was cast in the NBC series Dracula as Mina Murray alongside Jonathan Rhys Meyers and Oliver Jackson-Cohen. The series was cancelled after the first season.

In 2016, De Gouw was cast as fictional abolitionist Elizabeth Hawkes in the WGN series, Underground. She played the lead role Ren Amari in the 2017 feature film OtherLife based on the novel Solitaire by Kelley Eskridge.

De Gouw appeared in the 2018 Australian television movie Riot, about the 78ers, the Australian LGBTQ rights movement who fought for decriminalisation, recognition and equality. 

She played the role of Sergeant Klintoff's wife, Louisa, in Leah Purcell's debut feature film, The Drover's Wife: The Legend of Molly Johnson (2021).

Personal life
De Gouw was in a relationship for several years with her Dracula costar, Oliver Jackson-Cohen. 

In a June 2022 interview, she described herself as queer and said that she was in a relationship with a woman.

Filmography

Film

Television

Awards and nominations

Notes

References

External links

Living people
1988 births
21st-century Australian actresses
Actresses from Perth, Western Australia
Australian expatriates in England
Australian film actresses
Australian people of Dutch descent
Australian television actresses
Curtin University alumni
Australian LGBT actors
LGBT actresses
Queer actresses